Kaitain may stand for
An alternative name of Alpha Piscium in the constellation of Pisces. 
Kaitain (Dune), home planet of Imperial House Corrino in Frank Herbert's fictional Dune universe
Code name for OpenCms v5.0.x